This page documents all the tornadoes that touched down in the United States in May 2007. Tornadoes in the month of January are given with their Fujita Scale intensity while all tornadoes from February and on are given with their Enhanced Fujita Scale intensity. This is because the scale was changed on February 1 due to the National Weather Service implementing a more accurate way to classify tornadoes.

United States Yearly Total

Note: January tornadoes were rated using the old Fujita scale, but are included in the chart above by matching the F rating to the related EF scale rating.

May
There were 282 tornadoes were reported in the US in May, of which 251 were confirmed.

May 1 event

May 2 event

May 3 event

May 4 to May 6 event

A total of 132 tornadoes touched down in the United States during this tornado outbreak.

May 7 event

May 8 event

May 9 event

May 10 event

May 14 event

May 15 event

May 16 event

May 17 event

May 18 event

May 20 event

May 21 event

May 22 event

May 23 event

May 25 event

May 26 event

May 27 event

May 28 event

May 29 event

May 30 event

May 31 event

See also
 Tornadoes of 2007
 List of United States tornadoes in April 2007
 List of United States tornadoes from June to July 2007

Notes

References

F5 tornadoes
Tornadoes of 2007
2007 natural disasters in the United States
2007